Buffalo Center–Rake Community School District was a school district serving Buffalo Center and Rake, Iowa.

The district was established on July 1, 1978, with the merger of the Buffalo Center Community School District and the Rake Community School District.

In fall 1987, the Buffalo Center–Rake district and the Lakota Community School District entered into a grade-sharing arrangement in which students from both districts attended the Buffalo Center–Rake secondary school, and which had the same principal for the elementary level. The arrangement was approved the prior January 12. Each district still had its own superintendent.

In 1989, the Titonka Community School District began a program of sharing academic, athletic, and extracurricular activities with Buffalo Center–Rake. On July 1, 1989, Buffalo Center–Rake entered into a grade-sharing arrangement with the Lakota, Thompson and Titonka school districts. Earlier that year those districts and the Woden–Crystal Lake Community School District held discussions about a comprehensive plan for their region.

On July 1, 1992, the Buffalo Center–Rake and Lakota districts merged into the Buffalo Center–Rake–Lakota Community School District. The grade-sharing arrangement continued with the new district until 1995.

References

Defunct school districts in Iowa
Education in Kossuth County, Iowa
Education in Winnebago County, Iowa
1978 establishments in Iowa
School districts established in 1978
1992 disestablishments in the United States
Educational institutions disestablished in 1992